The Backyard is a 2002 American backyard wrestling documentary directed, produced and edited by Paul Hough and was scored by Seth Jordan. It features the appearance of former WWE and TNA professional wrestler, Rob Van Dam. Although it had a limited theatrical release in the United States in 2002, the film was later released to Germany and Australia in 2004.

Synopsis

This documentary reveals the violent, bizarre depths of the world of backyard wrestling to the mainstream. Director Paul Hough was working on a syndicated wrestling program when an audition tape led him to discover the widespread phenomenon online. Males of different ages who cannot afford pro wrestling school tuition or choose to make their activities a lifestyle, turn to compete in the unsanctioned battleground of their backyard, with the use of deadly elements and weapons, such as barbed wire, light tubes, fire, glass and staple guns. The film showcases Hough's tour, as he tracks several underground wrestlers in Arizona, Nevada, California, New York and England.

Cast

Most members of the cast go by their wrestling alias. The cast includes:

Tom Flynn 
The Lizard
Chaos
Scar
"Vince McMahon of Backyard Wrestling" Joshua James
Heartless
The Retarded Butcher
Sic
Phil Snyder
Lincoln Steen
Ryan Downes
Chris King
Marc Narburgh
Mike Turbeville
Adam Mikels
Mike Damage
Fooker Freer
PeeWee
Sammy Swift

Awards

Best Picture at Silver Lake Film Festival
Audience Award at Brooklyn International Film Festival
Best Lounge Film at Sonoma Valley Film Festival
Critic's Choice at Edinburgh International Film Festival
Director's Choice Award at Texas Film Festival
DVD of the Month by Maxim Magazine

Distribution

The film was released in select theaters in Germany and had a limited theatrical run in the United States. It was released on DVD and PSP, also later airing on television in the United Kingdom and the Netherlands.

Reception

The Backyard holds a 74% fresh rating on Rotten Tomatoes based on 14 reviews, equating to an average rating of 6.6 out of 10. Overall, it was met primarily with positive reviews. Dave Kehr, a writer for The New York Times, called it an "astounding anthropological study of that strange tribe known as the American teenager", and finished by claiming it is "strange" and "disturbing." John Petrakis of The Chicago Tribune labelled it a "first-rate documentary." Charles Martin chipped in for Film Threat, viewing the film as "a fascinating emotional rollercoaster", and that it "approaches the subject with genuine curiosity." Contributing his thoughts, Michael O'Sullivan of The Washington Post believes it's not for the squeamish, but that its "bone-crunching message is worth hearing."

References

External links
 The Backyard at the Internet Movie Database
 The Backyard at Rotten Tomatoes
 The Backyard at OFFOFFOFF.com

2002 films
2002 documentary films
American documentary films
Professional wrestling documentary films
Films directed by Paul Hough
2000s English-language films
2000s American films